The Caleb Lothrop House is a historic house in Cohasset, Massachusetts.  The two-story hip-roof wood-frame house was built in 1821, and is the only brick-ended houses in the town.  The house is a well-preserved example of Federal styling, featuring a center entry that is flanked by sidelight windows and pilasters.  The house served for a time as the headquarters of the Cohasset Historical Society.  Calep Lothrop, its builder, was the grandson of a Revolutionary War militia leader, and was descended from one of the area's first settlers.

The house was listed on the National Register of Historic Places in 1976.

See also
National Register of Historic Places listings in Norfolk County, Massachusetts

References

Houses in Norfolk County, Massachusetts
Cohasset, Massachusetts
Houses on the National Register of Historic Places in Norfolk County, Massachusetts
Federal architecture in Massachusetts
Houses completed in 1821